Winnie the Pooh in the Hundred Acre Wood is a single player adventure game created by Al Lowe for Sierra On-Line, released in 1986. It is based on Disney's Winnie the Pooh franchise.

Plot
The Hundred Acre Wood was populated with characters from A. A. Milne's Winnie the Pooh series of short stories.

Each character had lost an item of value to them and wanted the item returned. The player moves through the Hundred Acre Wood and collects the missing items then returns them to their rightful owners. Only one item can be carried at a time, so picking up one item means leaving behind of whatever item is currently being carried. Some screens have interactive sub-elements. For example: the player could "climb" Pooh's tree and see the limb where he kept his honey pots safely out of the reach of flood waters (a reference to a scene in the Disney animated featurette Winnie the Pooh and the Blustery Day and Chapter 9 of the first Winnie the Pooh book). The game has no animation in the mode of a traditional Quest game such as King's Quest. Rather, the Hundred Acre Wood existed as a grid of connected static screens. Players move between the screen using the arrow keys and can only move North, South, East or West. The missing items are randomly assigned at the start of each new game to screens within this grid, although the various characters can always be found on the same screens. When an item is "dropped" on a screen in order to "pick up" another item, the dropped item stays on that screen until the user returns to retrieve it later, but not all items belong to one of the characters - for example, a board belongs to the bridge. "Dropping" an item also returns it to the character it belongs to; if the character is not correct the game will let the player know.

Reuniting a character with their item results in a celebration screen, and a congratulatory party takes place once all 10 items have been successfully returned.

At random points, the items can be lost if the player runs into Tigger (who bounces them and makes the player drop what they are carrying), or when the wind starts again, mixing up any remaining objects that haven't yet been returned.

See also

List of Disney video games

External links
 Winnie the Pooh information at IF-Legends.org
 Winnie the Pooh downloads at Al Lowe's website

1986 video games
Adventure games
Amiga games
Apple II games
Atari ST games
Commodore 64 games
DOS games
ScummVM-supported games
Sierra Entertainment games
TRS-80 Color Computer games
U.S. Gold games
Video games scored by Al Lowe
Hundred Acre Wood
Video games developed in the United States
Single-player video games